Walcott Glacier is a glacier between Radian and Howchin Glaciers, descending eastward from the Royal Society Range toward Walcott Bay. Named by Taylor of the British Antarctic Expedition (1910–13), presumably for Charles D. Walcott, Director of the U.S. Geological Survey (1894–1907) and Secretary of the Smithsonian Institution, 1907–28. 

Two ice streams flow down from the glacier into Walcott Lake. They are named Walcott North Stream and Walcott South Stream in association with the glacier, and descriptively for their locations on it.

References 

Glaciers of Scott Coast